The Reed—Wood Place is a historic farmstead at 20 Meetinghouse Road in Littleton, Massachusetts.

Description and history 
It is a complex of attached buildings typical of 19th century New England farms. At one end is the main house, a  five bay wood-frame structure, was probably built sometime before 1812 for Isaac and Mary Gardner Reed. The house exhibits a variety of architectural styles, having elements of Federal, Greek Revival, Italianate, and Gothic Revival elements that were applied by successive generations in the 19th century. A  ell extends north from the main block, joining the house to a shed and early 19th-century barn, which have been adaptively rehabilitated into office space.

The house was listed on the National Register of Historic Places in 2000.

See also
National Register of Historic Places listings in Middlesex County, Massachusetts

References

Houses on the National Register of Historic Places in Middlesex County, Massachusetts
Greek Revival architecture in Massachusetts
Gothic Revival architecture in Massachusetts
Federal architecture in Massachusetts
Italianate architecture in Massachusetts
Littleton, Massachusetts